Inishfarnard meaning Island of the tall fern is a small island and a townland off Kilcatherine Point, in County Cork, Ireland.

Geography 

Near the northern tip of the island there are pleasant cliffs; the best landing place for boats (not suitable for kayaks) is located on the SE side of the island, near a fish farm. Freshwater, which was once available on the island, cannot be found anymore.

History 
A small community of 24 used to live on the island, which is now uninhabited, with its old houses abandoned as well as the neighbouring fields.

Fishing 
Inishfarnard is considered a good place for fishing.
A fish farm now operates in the waters on the southeast of the island, it is operated by Mowi.

See also

 List of islands of Ireland

References

Islands of County Cork
Uninhabited islands of Ireland
Townlands of County Cork